Mimie Mathy (8 July 1957) is a French actress, comedian and singer who is best known for her starring role in the long-running Josephine, Guardian Angel television series.

Life and career
Interested in the theatre from childhood, she studied the dramatic arts from 1979 to 1981 at Michel Fugain's workshop in Nice. In the early 1980s she performed in a number of theatre roles and appeared in Le Petit Théâtre de Bouvard television show. She formed a touring comedy troupe "Le Trio des Filles" (The Three Girls) which performed shows such as Existe en trois tailles (Available in Three Sizes) from 1988 to 1993. In 1993 she performed in the TV movie Une nounou pas comme les autres (A Nanny Like No Other), which garnered a 52.7% market share (~12 million viewers) in France.

Since 1994 she has performed 15 times in the annual Les Enfoirés (The Tossers) charity concert for Restaurants du Cœur (Restaurants of the Heart). Les Enfoirés was the most watched TV show in France in 2009, with 12.3 million viewers.

In 1997 she began her title role in Josephine, Guardian Angel, a TF1 TV Series really popular in France.

In 2006 she issued a music CD, La Vie M'a Raconte (Life Told Me) produced by Patrick Fiori.

Personal life
On 27 August 2005 she married  restaurateur and chef Benoist Gérard, a man she met during one of her shows by picking him out of the audience.

Philanthropy
Since May 2009, Mimie Mathy is a Goodwill Ambassador for UNICEF.

Discography

Filmography

Theatre

Bibliography

Awards and recognition
François Dorieux named a rose cultivar for her in 1999. In 2007 she was selected the fifth most popular French celebrity and highest ranking female celebrity by the weekly Le Journal du Dimanche.

References

External links
 

Living people
1957 births
Actresses from Lyon
Actors with dwarfism
French film actresses
French stage actresses
French television actresses
French women singers
20th-century French actresses
21st-century French actresses
Chevaliers of the Légion d'honneur